Isolation Stories is a British television mini-series about people living through the COVID-19 pandemic that was first broadcast on ITV on four consecutive nights from 4 May to 7 May 2020.

Episodes
 Mel (broadcast 4 May 2020) starring Sheridan Smith - written by Gaby Chiappe
 Ron & Russell (broadcast 5 May 2020) starring Michael Jibson - written by Jeff Pope
 Mike & Rochelle (broadcast 6 May 2020) starring Angela Griffin - written by William Ivory
 Karen (broadcast 7 May 2020) starring David Threlfall - written by Neil McKay

References

English-language television shows
2020 British television series debuts
2020s British television series
Media depictions of the COVID-19 pandemic in the United Kingdom